Gerasimus III was Ecumenical Patriarch of Constantinople from 1794 to 1797.

He descended from Cyprus. In 1762, he was elected metropolitan bishop of Vize, in 1783 of İzmit, and in 1791 of Derkoi. In the 3rd of March in 1794, he was elected Ecumenical Patriarch, succeeding Neophytus VII.

During his patriarchy, he regulated many ecclesiastic issues. One of which was setting an age requirement in the ordainment of clerics in 1795, prohibiting the ordainment of deacon under 25 years old and presbyter under 30 years old.

In the 19th of April in 1797, he resigned and retired to Tarabiye, where he died a while later.

References 

Greek Cypriot people
18th-century Ecumenical Patriarchs of Constantinople